Opening Night is a big band jazz recording of the Thad Jones/Mel Lewis Jazz Orchestra playing at the Village Vanguard club in New York City in February 1966. This was the first performance of the group at this club although the recording was not released until 2000. A 50-year tradition for Monday nights at the Village Vanguard began from this first evening for the Thad Jones/Mel Lewis Jazz Orchestra which later became the Mel Lewis Jazz Orchestra and eventually the Vanguard Jazz Orchestra. Resonance Records released what they term an "official release", approved by the Jones and Lewis estates, in 2016.

Track listing
All tracks composed by Thad Jones, except as indicated.
 Introduction (Mel Lewis & Alan Grant) – 1:50
 "Big Dipper" – 5:10
 "Polka Dots and Moonbeams" (Van Heusen, Burke) – 3:47
 "Once Around" – 12:37
 "All My Yesterdays" – 4:08
 "Morning Reverend" – 4:50
 "Low Down" – 4:25
 "Lover Man" (Davis, Ramirez, Sherman) – 5:08
 "Mean What You Say" – 5:35
 "Don't Ever Leave Me" – 4:15
 "Willow Weep for Me" (Ronell) – 6:25
 "The Little Pixie" – 13:45

Personnel
 Thad Jones – flugelhorn
 Mel Lewis – drums
 Hank Jones – piano
 Richard Davis – bass
 Sam Herman – guitar
 Jerome Richardson – alto saxophone, soprano saxophone, clarinet, bass clarinet, flute
 Jerry Dodgion – alto saxophone
 Joe Farrell – tenor saxophone, clarinet, flute
 Eddie Daniels – tenor saxophone, clarinet, bass clarinet
 Pepper Adams – baritone saxophone
 Snooky Young – trumpet
 Jimmy Owens – trumpet
 Bill Berry – trumpet
 Jimmy Nottingham – trumpet
 Bob Brookmeyer – trombone
 Jack Rains – trombone
 Garnett Brown – trombone
 Cliff Heather – trombone

References / external links

2000 live albums
The Thad Jones/Mel Lewis Orchestra live albums